Ben Foskett (born 1977) is a London and Paris-based British composer. His commissions have included Leckey for the CBSO Youth Orchestra and works for London Children's Ballet.

Selected works
Violin Concerto (2004) 
Trying to see more 2004
From Trumpet world premiere at the BBC Proms

Recordings
Ben Foskett - Dinosaur Five Night Pieces (for piano), Hornet II (for clarinet and orchestra), From Trumpet, On From Four, Dinosaur (for flute), Cinq Chansons à Hurle-Vent (saxophone and soprano). NMC Recordings Debut Series, June 2014

References

British male composers
1977 births
Living people